The Deep Sea Range is an RAF missile range in the Outer Hebrides. It has also been known as the Hebrides Guided Weapon Range and the South Uist Missile Range.

History

The range was operated by the Defence Evaluation and Research Agency (DERA), for evaluating new missiles. St Kilda became Scotland's first World Heritage Site in 1987.

The site was built in 1957 by the Ministry of Defence to test nuclear missiles. Opposition to the construction of the range resulted in the novel Rockets Galore!, by Sir Compton Mackenzie, which was made into a film, filmed on the island of Barra.

Resistance to the building of the range also led to the construction of the religious monument Our Lady of the Isles.

Structure
It is situated in the Outer Hebrides on South Uist. The missiles are tracked from St Kilda, Scotland, a now uninhabited island, which is now leased by the Ministry of Defence. The site is run by QinetiQ, a privatised former division of the MoD.

Around 230 people work across all sites of the range.

See also
 List of rocket launch sites
 1957 in Scotland
 BUTEC (British Underwater Test and Evaluation Centre) at Raasay
 Luce Bay in Dumfries and Galloway
 RAF Tain on the Moray Firth

References

External links
 Hebrides Missile Range

1957 establishments in Scotland
Bombing ranges
Buildings and structures in the Outer Hebrides
Guided missiles of the United Kingdom
History of the Outer Hebrides
Military installations in Scotland
Military units and formations established in 1957
Qinetiq
South Uist
St Kilda, Scotland